Xocahan is a village in the Qubadli District of Azerbaijan.

History 
The village was located in the Armenian-occupied territories surrounding Nagorno-Karabakh, coming under the control of ethnic Armenian forces during the First Nagorno-Karabakh War in August 1993. The village subsequently became part of the breakaway Republic of Artsakh as part of its Kashatagh Province, referred to as Pakahan. It was recaptured by Azerbaijan on 9 November 2020 during the 2020 Nagorno-Karabakh war.

References

External links 
 

Populated places in Qubadli District